Alan McCulloch (born 19 August 1953) is a Scottish former footballer, who played for Kilmarnock and St Mirren. He also played for the Scottish League XI and the Scotland under-21s.

References

1953 births
Living people
Scottish footballers
Association football goalkeepers
Kilbirnie Ladeside F.C. players
Kilmarnock F.C. players
St Mirren F.C. players
Scottish Football League players
Scottish Football League representative players
Scotland under-21 international footballers